KGROUP is an international company founded by Joseph Ichame Kamach in 1972.

KGROUP deeply rooted in Central African Republic. The group, led by Yvon Kamach today is the largest private employer in the country and continues to expand across four areas: exploitation / industry and services / distribution / real estate.

KGROUP is a company in the Central African Republic, first private employer. The group included in four clusters:

BU Exploitation (Wood, Gold, Diamonds)- K Timber (Société Centrafricaine d'Agriculture et de Déroulage) > SCAD Wood

- K Mines (Khordia)

- K Mining (Goodspeed)

BU Distribution 

- Dameca

- K Mat > furniture kits, electrician's supplies, household hardware, plumbing supplies, pool supplies, construction materials, etc.

- K Market > supermarket, foods

- K Bois

BU Industrie/Service

- K Service > maintenance, engineering...

- K Menuiserie

BU Immobilier/Real Estate

- Kamach Promotion Immobilière

- SCI Kamach fils

Golf de Bangui - golf course, golf shop

Currently, it is redefining its structure and strategic positioning to better serve not only the Central African Republic, but also the Central African region.

Companies of the Central African Republic